Stig Pierre Antonio Gallo (born 24 January 1975) is a Swedish football coach and former footballer. He made 89 Allsvenskan matches for AIK, Djurgårdens IF and Landskrona BoIS. A youth international for Sweden, he represented the Sweden U19 and U21 teams in the mid-1990s.

After his active career he continued as assistant coach in IK Frej.

References

External links 
  (archive)

Swedish footballers
AIK Fotboll players
Djurgårdens IF Fotboll players
Bryne FK players
Landskrona BoIS players
IFK Norrköping players
IK Sirius Fotboll players
IK Frej players
Allsvenskan players
1974 births
Living people
Association football midfielders
Footballers from Stockholm